Six ships of the Royal Navy have been named HMS Zebra, after the Zebra.

  was a 14-gun sloop launched in 1777.
Her Captain died the same year was killed in a duel in New York City with Lt-Col. Pennington over a sonnet written by the latter, reflecting on Lady Bridget's wit. Tollemache was run through the heart. 
Old Trinity 
by Park Benjamin
Thou fane of many years, farewell!
Thy walls must in the dust be laid,
And we can now no longer pray
Where our forefathers prayed.
The altar at whose holy base
The kneeling crowds received the wine,
Must be no more a guarded spot,
A consecrated shrine!

Never again from thy tall spire,
Up-pointing to the Christian's home,
Shall peal the bell, whose Sabbath voice
Rolled o'er thy vaulted dome;
Nor shall the daily passer hear
Its solemn and familiar chime
Fall, like the ringing, signal strokes
Of that gray watchman, Time!

The monuments of good men gone,
Down from their niches rudely torn,
Inscribed in memory of good deeds,
Away from sight are borne;
And other tablatures will take
The places which they had of old;
But oh, what graven shapes or lines
Can tell the tale they told?

Thou venerable pile, adieu!
Another temple soon may tower
On thy foundations grand and high—
The wonder of the hour!
Let Art her gorgeous skill display,
And put thy humble walls to shame—
There still are hearts, old church, to keep
Thy worship and thy name!
She was abandoned and blown up after going aground on 22 October 1778 at Little Egg Harbor, New Jersey, during the American Revolutionary War.
 , launched in 1780, was an 18-gun sloop, converted to a bomb vessel, and sold in 1812.
 , launched in 1815, was the last of the 18-gun s. She spent much of her career based at Port Jackson, Australia. She was wrecked on 2 December 1840 near Haifa.
 A 16-gun brig-sloop was named Zebra in 1846 but renamed Jumna before being launched in 1848.
She was scrapped in 1873.
 , launched on 3 December 1895, was the lead ship of her class of destroyers. She was sold for scrap in 1914.
 A destroyer of the V and W class was to have been named Zebra, but she was cancelled in 1919.
 A destroyer of the W and Z class was to have been named Zebra, but was renamed  on the stocks before being launched in 1943.
  was a Z-class destroyer, originally named Wakeful, but renamed on the stocks to make way for her sister ship. She was launched on 18 March 1944 at William Denny & Brothers shipyard in Dumbarton, Scotland and commissioned on 13 October 1945.

References

Royal Navy ship names